Meherpur Sadar is an upazila of Meherpur District in the Division of Khulna, Bangladesh. Meherpur is the smallest district of Bangladesh in the South-western part within the Khulna Division. Before the partition in 1947, Meherpur was a part of the Nadia district of undivided India. Before 1984, it was a subdivision of Kushtia district. Meherpur consists of 1 municipality, 9 wards and 72 mahallas, 3 upazilas, 18 union parishads, 277 villages, 190 mouzas. The upazilas are Meherpur Sadar, Gangni and Mujibnagar.

History
Bangladesh's Proclamation of Independence was solemnly made at the village Baidyanathtola (now Mujibnagar), on 17 April 1971 of this district. The first provisional government of Bangladesh began here under the leadership of Tajuddin Ahmed. After that day on 18 April 1971, the Pakistani army killed 8 people at village of Amjhupi.

Geography
Meherpur Sadar is located at. It has 49043 households and total area 374.1 km2.

Meherpur Sadar Upazila is bounded by Gangni Upazila and Tehatta I CD Block, in Nadia District, West Bengal, India, on the north, Gangni Upazila and Alamdanga Upazila, the latter in Chuadanga District, on the east, Damurhuda Upazila and Mujibnagar Upazila in Chuadanga District, on the south and Tehatta I CD Block in Nadia district, on the west.

Main rivers
The main rivers are Bhairab, Mathabhaga and Kazli.

Demographics
According to the 2011 Bangladesh census, Meherpur Sadar Upazila had 64,130 households and a population of 256,642, 16.8% of whom lived in urban areas. 8.3% of the population was under the age of 5. The literacy rate (age 7 and over) was 49.4%, compared to the national average of 51.8%.

According to the 1991 Bangladesh census, Meherpur Sadar had a population of 262,779, of whom 140,387 were aged 18 or over. Males constituted 51.2% of the population, and females 48.8%. Meherpur Sadar has an average literacy rate of 24.9% (7+ years), and the national average of 32.4%.

Administration
Meherpur Sadar Upazila is divided into Meherpur Municipality and five union parishads: Amdah, Amjhupi, Buripota, Kutubpur, and Pirojpur. The union parishads are subdivided into 61 mauzas and 104 villages.

Meherpur Municipality is subdivided into 9 wards and 72 mahallas.

See also
Upazilas of Bangladesh
Districts of Bangladesh
Divisions of Bangladesh

References

Upazilas of Meherpur District
Meherpur District
Khulna Division